Aburina is a genus of moths of the family Erebidae.

Species
Aburina chrysa Gaede, 1940
Aburina coerulescens Hampson, 1926
Aburina dufayi Viette, 1979
Aburina electa Karsch, 1896
Aburina endoxantha Hampson, 1926
Aburina exangulata Gaede, 1940
Aburina jucunda Karsch, 1896
Aburina leucocharagma Hampson, 1926
Aburina marmorata Berio, 1974
Aburina morosa (Holland, 1920) (syn: Aburina pallidior (Holland, 1920))
Aburina multilineata (Holland, 1920)
Aburina peyrierasi Viette, 1979
Aburina phoenocrosmena Hampson, 1926
Aburina poliophaea Hampson, 1926
Aburina sobrina Möschler, 1887 (syn: Aburina piana (Swinhoe, 1909), Aburina rectangula Strand, 1918)
Aburina tetragramma Hampson, 1926
Aburina transversata (Holland, 1920)
Aburina uncinata Berio, 1974
Aburina uniformis Swinhoe, 1919 (syn: Aburina nigripalpis (Hampson, 1898))

References

Natural History Museum Lepidoptera genus database

Calpinae
Moth genera